Hillman College was a women's college in Clinton, Mississippi, that existed from 1853 until 1942. It was originally named the Central Female Institute, and renamed Hillman College in 1891. It was organized by the Central Baptist Association, and remained in operation throughout the American Civil War. Mississippi College purchased and absorbed Hillman in 1942.

Charles Hillman Brough, the governor of Arkansas from 1917 to 1921, was a faculty member at Hillman College early in his career.

This college should not be confused with the fictional HBCU which provided the setting for the Cosby Show spin-off, A Different World.

References

External links
History of Mississippi College
Mary Carol Miller. Lost Landmarks of Mississippi

Mississippi College
Educational institutions established in 1853
Defunct private universities and colleges in Mississippi
Educational institutions disestablished in 1942
1853 establishments in Mississippi
1942 disestablishments in Mississippi